Ewa Maria Wiśniewska (born 25 April 1942) is a Polish actress.  Her sister, Małgorzata Niemirska, is also an actress.

Wiśniewska was awarded the Order of Polonia Restituta, one of Poland's highest Orders, and many other Orders, including Gold Cross of Merit.

Selected filmography 
 Zbrodniarz i panna (1963)
 Prawo i pięść (1964)
 Three Steps on Earth (1965)
 Sam pośród miasta (1965)
 Życie raz jeszcze (1965)
 Frozen Flashes (1967)
 Stawka większa niż życie (1967–1968, TV series)
 Tylko umarły odpowie (1969)
 Doktor Ewa (1970, TV series)
 Janosik (1973)
 What Will You Do When You Catch Me? (1978)
 Hallo Szpicbródka czyli ostatni występ króla kasiarzy (1978)
 Umarli rzucają cień (1978)
 Paciorki jednego różańca (1979)
 Białe tango (1981)
 Wielka majówka (1981)
 Dolina Issy (1982)
 Mgła (1983)
 Osobisty pamiętnik grzesznika przez niego samego spisany (1985)
 Cudzoziemka (1986)
 Dotknięci (1988)
 With Fire and Sword (1999)
 The Hexer (2001)
 An Ancient Tale: When the Sun Was a God (2003)
 Bitwa warszawska 1920 (2011)

External links
 

1942 births
Living people
Polish film actresses
Knights of the Order of Polonia Restituta
Recipients of the Silver Cross of Merit (Poland)
Recipients of the Gold Cross of Merit (Poland)
Recipients of the Silver Medal for Merit to Culture – Gloria Artis
Actresses from Warsaw
20th-century Polish actresses
21st-century Polish actresses